Alexander Vasilyevich Fedotov (23 June 1932, Stalingrad, USSR – 4 April 1984, USSR) was a Soviet test pilot who was a Hero of the Soviet Union, Honoured Test Pilot of the USSR, Lenin Prize holder and Major-General of Aviation.

Biography
He was born on 23 June 1932 in the town of Stalingrad in the USSR in a family of Russian ethnicity. During the Second World War he and his mother fled from the besieged Stalingrad. The Fedotov family returned to Stalingrad only after its liberation, but without Alexandrov's father, who fought on the front and died in battle Warsaw Uprising in 1944. In 1947 at the age of fifteen he completed the seven-year primary school and joined the 7th Specialised School of Air Armed Forces USSR.

Career

Fedotov attended the Armavir Military Aviation School of Pilots at Armavir, Krasnodar Krai, Russia, graduating in 1952, and then became a flight instructor.

In 1958 he attended the Ministry of Industrial Aviation Test Pilot School at Zhukovsky. He graduated from the Moscow Aviation Institute in 1965.

From August 1958 to his death in 1984, he was a test pilot of the Mikoyan bureau. Fedotov participated in the tests of the MiG-19, MiG-21, MiG-23, MiG-25, MiG-27, MiG-29, MiG-31 and their modifications. For the first time in the country, he reached a speed corresponding to Mach 3.

On E-166 and MiG-25 aircraft, he set 18 world aviation records (of which three are absolute), speed, dynamic ceiling, load capacity and climbing speed. In particular, he still owns the unaccounted flight altitude record (37,650 metres) for manned jet aircraft, established on 3 August 1977, on an experimental MiG-25M fighter.

Fedotov lived in the city of Zhukovsky in the Moscow region.

He died on 4 April 1984, during a test flight on the MiG-31, together with the test navigator V.S. Zaitsev. In that flight there was a false alarm indication of the emergency fuel reserve system, and Fedotov decided to land. Believing that there was little fuel on the plane, he made a sharp manoeuver, but the heavy, fuel-filled airplane rolled over and dived into the ground. Neither Fedotov nor Zaitsev survived.

He was buried at the Bykov cemetery of the city of Zhukovsky.

His honors included being awarded Major-General of Aviation (1983), Honored Coach of the USSR (1976), master of sports of international class (1975), Honoured Test Pilot of the USSR (1969), and Hero of the Soviet Union (1966). He was awarded the FAI Gold Air Medal in 1975, and the Lenin Prize in 1981. He was awarded two Orders of Lenin, the Order of the Red Banner, the Red Banner of Labour and medals.

Memorial
 There is a Fedotov Street in the city of Zhukovsky
 The name of Alexandr Fedotov is assigned to the main Russian test pilot school in Zhukovsky
 The name Alexandr Fedotov was awarded to school No. 24 in the Kirov district of the city of Volgograd
 There is a bust of him in Armavir, Russia

See also
Flight altitude records

References

1932 births
1984 deaths
Aviators killed in aviation accidents or incidents
Heroes of the Soviet Union
Military personnel from Volgograd
Soviet aviation record holders
Soviet test pilots
Victims of aviation accidents or incidents in 1984
Victims of aviation accidents or incidents in the Soviet Union